Marina Radu (born September 5, 1984 in Montreal, Quebec) is a water polo player from Canada. She was a member of the Canada women's national water polo team which claimed the silver medal at the 2007 Pan American Games in Rio de Janeiro, Brazil.

See also
 List of World Aquatics Championships medalists in water polo

External links
 

1984 births
Living people
Canadian people of Romanian descent
Canadian female water polo players
Water polo players from Montreal
Université de Montréal alumni
Water polo players at the 2007 Pan American Games
Water polo players at the 2011 Pan American Games
Pan American Games silver medalists for Canada
Pan American Games medalists in water polo
Medalists at the 2011 Pan American Games